Ria Noora Minerva Öling (born 15 September 1994) is a Finnish footballer who plays as a midfielder for Damallsvenskan club FC Rosengård and the Finland national team.

Club career
In 2014 Öling was named Finland's Player of the Season after hitting 16 league goals for her club, TPS.

In January 2018, Öling signed for Danish champions Brøndby IF.

In December 2020, Öling signed for Swedish club FC Rosengård

International career
Öling played her first senior international for Finland women's national team in February 2015 against Sweden. She had already represented her country at the 2013 UEFA Women's U-19 Championship and the 2014 FIFA U-20 Women's World Cup.

She scored her first senior international goal on the occasion of her fifth cap, in a 1–0 UEFA Women's Euro 2017 qualifying win over Montenegro on 17 September 2015.

International goals

References

External links
 
 
 Ria Öling at Football Association of Finland (SPL) 
 
 
 

1994 births
Finnish expatriate footballers
Finnish women's footballers
Finland women's international footballers
Finnish expatriate sportspeople in Spain
Expatriate women's footballers in Spain
Living people
Kansallinen Liiga players
PK-35 Vantaa (women) players
Finnish expatriate sportspeople in Denmark
Expatriate women's footballers in Denmark
Brøndby IF (women) players
Primera División (women) players
Santa Teresa CD players
Women's association football midfielders
Sportspeople from Vaasa
Turun Palloseura (women's football) players
Damallsvenskan players
Växjö DFF players
UEFA Women's Euro 2022 players